This is a list of the Beylerbeys, Pashas and Deys of the Regency of Algiers:

Beylerbeys (1517-1576) 
Oruç Barbarossa 1517-1518
Barbaros Hayrettin Pasha Khidr Reis 1518-1545
Hasan Agha 1535-1543
 Hadji Pacha 1543-1544
Hasan Pasha 1545-1552 (son of Barbarossa Hayreddin Pasha)
 Caïd Saffa 1551 (for seven months)
Salah Rais 1552-1556
Hasan Corso 1556
Muhammad Kurdogli 1556
Yusuf I 1556
Yahyia Pasha 1557
Hasan Pasha (second time) 1557-1561
Ahmed Bostandji 1561-1562
Hasan Pasha (third time) 1562-1566
Muhammad I Pasha 1566-1568 (son of Salah Rais)
Kılıç Ali Paşa 1568-1571
Arab Ahmed Pasha 1571-1573
Ramdan Pasha 1573-1576

Pashas (1576-1659) 
Hassan III 1576-1580
Djafar Pasha 1580-1581
Hassan III (second time) 1581-1584
Mami Muhammad Pasha 1584-1586
Dali Ahmed Pasha 1586
Hassan III (third time) 1586-1588
Hızır Pasha 1588-1591
Hadji Shaban Pasha 1591-1593
Mustapha Pasha 1593-1594
Kader Pasha (second time) 1594-1595
Mustapha II Pasha 1596-1599
Daly Hassan Pasha 1599-1601
Somiman Pasha 1601-1603
Muhammad II the eunuch 1605-1607
Mustapha III Pasha 1607
Redwan Pasha 1607-1610
Kussa Mustapha 1610-1614
Hasan IV 1614-1616
Mustapha IV Pasha  1616-1619
Kassan Kaid Kussa 1619-1621
Kader Pasha 1621-1626
Hassan Khodja 1626-1634
Yusuf II 1634-1645
Ali Bitchin 1645 (debatable)
Mahmud Brusali Pasha 1645-1647
Yusef Pasha 1647-1650
Mehmed Pasha 1650-1653
Ahmed Pasha (first period of rule) 1653-1655
Ibrahim Pasha (first period) 1655-1656
Ahmed Pasha (second period) 1656-1657
Ibrahim Pasha (second period) 1657-1659
Ahmed Pasha (third period) 1658-1659

Aghas (1659-1671) 

 1659-1660: Khalil Agha
 1660-1661: Ramadan Agha
 1661-1665: Chabane Agha
 1665-1671: Ali Agha

Deys of the Deylik of Algiers

No. 
Dark Purple: Deys instated by the Taifa of Raises

Red: Deys instated by the Odjak of Algiers

Pink: Deys elected by the Diwan of Algiers

Portrait 
Portrait or depiction of the dey, if one exists

Date of rule 
Years this Dey ruled

Origins 
The ethnicity of the Dey is in italics.

Algiers = Known to have been born in the city of Algiers. This isn't referring to their ethnicity, although it does mean that they were likely Kouloughlis or Algerians. Note that as information is scarce on the Origins of the Deys, some deys may have been born in Algiers whom we have no sources on.

A Kouloughli is someone of mixed heritage, through a Janissary father and an Algerian mother. Many Janissaries were Greeks, Serbs, Albanians, and Bulgarians, and the Odjak of Algiers was not solely, or mainly composed of Turks.

Timeline

See also 

 List of rulers of Algeria before independence
 Ottoman Algeria
 Turks in Algeria
 Ottoman Empire

Sources

References

Pasha and Dey of Algiers
Pasha and Dey
Heads of state of Algeria
Algiers
 
 16th century in Algiers